The 1968–69 Mexican Segunda División was the 19th season of the Mexican Segunda División. The season started on 15 March 1968 and concluded on 16 February 1969. It was won by Torreón.

Changes 
 Laguna was promoted to Primera División.
 Morelia was relegated from Primera División.
 Orizaba was relegated from Segunda División.
 Zapata was promoted from Tercera División.

Teams

League table

Results

References 

1968–69 in Mexican football
Segunda División de México seasons